MRSI can refer to the following:
 Magnetic resonance spectroscopy imaging (in medical imaging)
 Multiple Rounds Simultaneous Impact (in artillery)